Siah Kola (also Romanized as Sīāh Kolā, Seyāh Kalā, Sīāh Kalā, and Siāh Kola; also known as Mordi) is a village in Natel Kenar-e Sofla Rural District, in the Central District of Nur County, Mazandaran Province, Iran. At the 2006 census, its population was 419, in 105 families.

References 

Populated places in Nur County